Det Bästa Med Robyn is a greatest hits album by Swedish pop singer Robyn. It was released by Sony BMG on 30 August 2006 in Sweden only. This was also her final album with Sony BMG.

Track listing
This album includes album tracks, singles and promo singles from her first three studio albums, excluding the singles Keep This Fire Burning and Don't Stop the Music.

Notes
  Denniz Pop is incorrectly credited as a writer for "Show Me Love".
  Signifies an additional producer.
  Roger Williams is incorrectly credited as "Robert Williams".
  Signifies a co-producer.

2006 compilation albums
Robyn albums
Sony BMG compilation albums
2006 greatest hits albums